This is a list of Mikoyan-Gurevich MiG-27 operators. Active operators are in bold.

Operators

As of 2022, the Kazakh Air Force is the only active operator of the MiG-27 in the world.

Belarus
The Belarusian Air Force inherited a small number of MiG-27s of the 911th APIB, based at Lida, after the dissolution of the Soviet Union. These aircraft were scrapped at Baranovichi. 
911th APIB at Lida, MiG-27K

India
The Indian Air Force operated the largest MiG-27 fleet outside the Soviet Union from 1988 to 2020.

Eastern Air Command
No.2 Squadron 'Winged Arrows', Kalaikunda
No.9 Squadron 'Wolfpack', Hindan
No.10 Squadron 'Winged Daggers', Jodhpur
No.18 Squadron 'Flying Bullets', Hindon, moved to Kalaikunda in 1996
No.20 Squadron 'Lightnings', Kalaikunda
No.22 Squadron, 'Swifts', Hasimara
No. 29 Squadron 'Black Scorpions', Jodhpur
No. 51 Squadron 'Sword Arms', Jamnagar
No. 222 Squadron 'Tigersharks', Hasimara
Aircraft and Systems Testing Establishment, Bangalore
Tactics and Air Combat Development Establishment, Jamnagar

Kazakhstan
The Kazakhstan Air Force is the only active operator of the MiG-27 as of October 2021.
129th APIB - Soviet Air Force regiment operating MiG-27s from Taldykorgan Air Base in Kazakh territory when the Soviet Union collapsed, MiG-27M
134th APIB - Another Soviet unit based at Zhangiztobe Air Base, MiG-27M
60th IAP
604th Aviation Base at Taldykorgan, formed out of the 60th, 129th and 134th regiments, MiG-27M

Russia
The Russian Air Force inherited most of the remaining MiG-27s after the collapse of the USSR. However, these were quickly retired in favour of the Su-24 and Su-25.

USSR

Direct Reporting Units 

 4th TsBP, Lipetsk
 91st IISAP, Lipetsk-2
 760th IIAPIB, Lipetsk-2
 1080th UATs PLS, Borisoglebsk
 707th IAPIB / 1st GvIAPIB, Lebyazhye
 GNIKI VVS, Akhtubinsk
 333rd OIAP, Vladimirovka?
 929th GLITs
 4020th BRS, Lipetsk-2
 4215th BRS, Dmitriyevka

Baltic Military District 

 15th Air Army (Latvian Soviet Socialist Republic), Riga
 53rd GvAPIB, Šiauliai, Lithuanian Soviet Socialist Republic
 88th APIB, Suurkyul, Estonian Soviet Socialist Republic
 321st APIB, Suurkyul
 372nd APIB, Lotsaki, Daugavpils, Latvian Soviet Socialist Republic
 899th APIB, Lielvārde

Belorussian Military District 

 26th Air Army, Minsk
 1st GvADIB
 911th APIB, Lida (transferred to Western Group of Forces 1989)
 940th APIB, Postavy Air Base

Carpathian Military District 

 15th Air Army
 289th ADIB, L'vov
 236th APIB, Chortkiv
 314th APIB, Cherlyany

Central Asian Military District 

 73rd Air Army, Tashkent
 10th IAD, Ucharal
 134th APIB, Zhangiztobe
 24th SAD, Taldy-Kurgan
 129th APIB, Taldy-Kurgan

Far Eastern Military District 

 1st Air Army, Khabarovsk
 33rd ADIB
 300th APIB, Pereyaslavka
 303rd ADIB, Ussuriysk
 18th 'Vitebskiy' GvIAP, Galyonki
 224th APIB, Ozornaya Pad

Kiev Military District 

 17th Air Army, Kiev
 88th APIB, Kanatovo (air base)Kanatovo

Leningrad Military District 

 76th Air Army, Leningrad
 722nd OIBAP/OAPIB, Smuravyevo

Odessa Military District 
5th Air Army, Odessa
642nd GvOIBAP/GVOAPIB, Matynovka Air Base, Voznesensk

Transbaikal Military District
23rd Air Army, Chita
30th ADIB, Step
58th IBAP/APIB, Step
266th APIB, Step

Volga Military District
281st IAPIB, Totskoye-2

Central Group of Forces (Czechoslovakia)
131st SAD, Milovice
236th APIB, Hradčany-Mimon

Southern Group of Forces
36th Air Army, Budapest
1st GvAPIB, Kunmadaras
88th GvAPIB, Debrecen (both this unit and the 1st GvAPIB reported directly to HQ Southern Group in Budapest)

Western Group of Forces
16th Air Army, Wünsdorf
105th APIB, Großenhain
296th APIB, Altenburg, moved to Großenhain
559th 'Mozyrskiy' APIB, Fürstenwalde
911th APIB, Brand (later withdrawn to Lida, Belarus)
125th GvADIB, Rechlin
19th GvAPIB, Lärz

Group of Soviet Forces in Mongolia
23rd Air Army, Choibolsan
44th SAK, Choibolsan
29th ADIB, Choibolsan
266th APIB, Nalaïh

Soviet Naval Aviation
Northern Fleet
88th OMAPIB

Sri Lanka

The Sri Lankan Air Force (SLAF) purchased five MiG-27s from Ukraine in 2000. These were used in the Sri Lankan Civil War.
No.5 Squadron, Katunayake
No.12 Squadron, Colombo

Ukraine

ALthough the Soviet Air Force had not based any MiG-27 regiments in Ukraine, when the Soviet Union fell 49 MiG-27s of various models were undergoing maintenance in Ukraine.
117th ARZ, Lvіv-Sknyliv
562nd ARZ, Odesa
536th ARZ, Chuhuiv
805th ARZ, Dnipro
6221st BLAT, Ovruch

References

Bibliography 
 Gordon, Y. and Komissarov, D., 'Mikoyan MiG-23 & MiG-27', Crecy Publishing, Manchester, 2019 

Russian Aircraft Corporation MiG
MiG-27
MiG-27
Mik